Islam was the first-recorded monotheistic religion in the Philippines. Islam reached the Philippines in the 14th century with the arrival of Muslim traders from the Persian Gulf, southern India, and their followers from several sultanates in the wider Malay Archipelago. The first missionaries then followed in the late 14th and early 15th centuries. They facilitated the formation of sultanates and conquests in mainland Mindanao and Sulu. Those who converted to Islam came to be known as the Moros, with Muslim conquest reaching as far as Tondo that was later supplanted by Bruneian Empire vassal-state of Maynila.

Muslim sultanates had already begun expanding in the central Philippines by the 16th century, when the Spanish fleet led by Ferdinand Magellan arrived. The subsequent Spanish conquest led to Catholic Christianity becoming the predominant religion in most of the modern-day Philippines, with Islam becoming a significant minority religion.

In the 21st century, there is some disagreement regarding the size of the Muslim population. The 2000 Census reported that Muslims comprised about five percent of the population and a 2015 report of Philippine Statistics Authority asserted that 4.1% of Filipinos were Muslims. However, it was reported in 2004 that some Muslim groups asserted that the proper number was between eight and twelve percent. , the National Commission on Muslim Filipinos (NCMF) estimated a figure of 4-5 percent, attributing the difference to a number of factors.

Most Muslims live in parts of Mindanao, Palawan, and the Sulu Archipelago – an area known as Bangsamoro or the Moro region. Some have migrated into urban and rural areas in different parts of the country. Most Muslim Filipinos practice Sunni Islam according to the Shafi'i school.

History

In 1380, Makhdum Karim reached the Sulu Archipelago and Jolo in the Philippines and established Islam in the country through trade in several regions of the island. In 1390, Minangkabau Prince Rajah Baguinda and his followers preached Islam on the islands. The Sheik Karimol Makhdum Mosque was the first mosque established in the Philippines on Simunul in Mindanao in the 14th century.

Subsequent settlements by Indian Muslim missionaries traveling to Malaysia and Indonesia helped strengthen Islam in the Philippines and each settlement was governed by a datu, rajah and sultan. Islam was introduced by Chinese Muslims, Indian Muslims, and Persians. Islamic provinces founded in the Philippines included the Sultanate of Maguindanao, Sultanate of Sulu, Sultanate of Lanao and other parts of the southern Philippines.

When the Spanish fleet led by Miguel López de Legazpi arrived in the Philippines in 1565, they were met by local datus as they traveled in the islands. Arriving in the Maynila, a vassal-state of the Sultanate of Brunei, in 1570 they were met by the Muslim rajah, Rajah Sulayman.

By the next century conquests had reached the Sulu islands in the southern tip of the Philippines where the population was Buddhist and Hindu and they took up the task of converting the animistic population to Islam with renewed zeal. By the 15th century, half of Luzon (Northern Philippines) and the islands of Mindanao in the south had become subject to the various Muslim sultanates of Borneo and much of the population in the almost of South were converted to Islam. However, the Visayas was largely dominated by Hindu-Buddhist societies led by rajahs and datus who strongly resisted Islam. One reason could be the economic and political disasters preeuropean Muslim pirates from the Mindanao region brought during raids. These frequent attacks gave way to naming present-day Cebu as then-Sugbo or scorched earth which was a defensive technique implemented by the Visayans so the pirates had nothing much to loot.

Invasion of Bruneian Sultanate
In the year 1498–99, the Bruneian Empire conducted a series of raids against the natives of the Taytay in Palawan and the island of Mindoro which had been subjugated to the Islamic Bruneian Empire under Sultan Bolkiah. The Muslim conquest reached as far as Tondo, which was supplanted by Brunei's vassal-state of Maynila.

The Muslim Bruneian Empire under the rule of Sultan Bolkiah, who is an ancestor of the current Sultan of Brunei subjugated the Tondo, which was ruled by Rajah Sukwu during 1500. The aftermath of the battle was the formation of an alliance between the newly established Kingdom of Guihulngan (Selurong) and the Bruneian Empire to crush the power of Tondo and the subsequent installation of the Pro-Islamic Rajah Sulaiman into power. Furthermore, Sultan Bolkiah's victory over Sulu and Seludong (modern day Manila), as well as his marriages to Laila Mecanai the daughter of Sulu Sultan Amir al-Ombra (an uncle of Sharifa Mahandun married to Nakhoda Angging or Maharaja Anddin of Sulu), and to the daughter of Datu Kemin, widened Brunei's influence in the Philippines.

A new dynasty began under a local Lumad leader who accepted Islam and became Rajah Salalila or Rajah Sulayman I. He also started to established a trading challenge to the already rich House of Rajah Lakandula in Tondo. Islam was further strengthened by the arrival of Muslim traders and from Jolo, Mindanao, Malaysia, and Indonesia.

Rajah Salalila and Rajah Matanda in the south (now the Intramuros district) were installed as Muslim rajas by converted Muslims and the Buddhist-Hindu settlement was under Lakandula in northern Tundun (now Tondo, Manila.)

Influences of Zheng He's voyages

The Chinese Muslim mariner Zheng He is credited with founding several Chinese Muslim communities in Mandaue and along the shores of Lapu-lapu, the Bohol Peninsula, and the Philippines during China's early Ming dynasty. These Muslims supposedly followed the Badjao school in the Chinese language. This Chinese Muslim community was led by Hajji Yan Ying Yu, who urged his followers to assimilate and take local names.

Spanish encounter
Rajah Sulayman was the Rajah of Maynila, a polity at the mouth of the Pasig River where it meets Manila Bay, at the time the Spanish forces first came to Luzon.

Sulayman resisted the Spanish forces, and thus, along with Rajah Matanda and Lakan Dula, was one of three Rajahs who played significant roles in what was the Spanish conquest of their polities of the Pasig River delta in the early 1570s.

Moro (derived from the Spanish word meaning Moors) is the appellation inherited from the Spaniards, for Filipino Muslims of Mindanao. The Spanish distinguished the Moro from the Indios, which referred to the Christianised people of Luzon and the Visayas. Islam continued to spread in Mindanao, from centers such as Sulu and Cotabato.

The Muslims seek to establish an independent Islamic province in Mindanao to be named Bangsamoro. The term Bangsamoro is a combination of an Old Malay word meaning nation or state with the Spanish word Moro which means Muslim. A significant Moro Rebellion occurred during the Philippine–American War. Conflicts and rebellion have continued in the Philippines from the pre-colonial period up to the present. Other related issue with the Moro secession is the territorial dispute of eastern Sabah in Malaysia which claimed by the Sultanate of Sulu as their territory.

The Moros have a history of resistance against Spanish, American, and Japanese rule for over 400 years. The violent armed struggle against the Spanish, Americans, Japanese and Filipinos is considered by current Moro (Muslim) leaders as part of the four centuries long "national liberation movement" of the Bangsamoro (Muslim Nation). The 400-year-long resistance against the Japanese, Filipinos, Americans, and Spanish by the Moro/Muslims persisted and morphed into their current war for independence against the Philippine state.

Muslim leaders in Zamboanga petitioned the Ottoman Empire to send a representative to advise them on religious matters. A scholar from the Shaykh al-Islām was sent in response.

Modern age

In 2012, research was conducted on various cultural properties in Islamic areas in Mindanao. The research included the 'Maradika' Qur'an of Bayang, description of the notes found in the Qur'an of Bayang, the Qur'an and Islamic manuscripts of the Sheikh Ahmad Bashir collection, the 'Dibolodan' Qur'an of Bacong in Marantao, the Qur'an and prayer scroll of Guro sa Masiu in Taraka, the 'Story of the Prophet Muhammad' at the Growing Memorial Research Center of the Dansalan College, and the Islamic Manuscript Art of the Philippines. In 2014, the Maradika Qur'an of Bayang was declared as a National Cultural Treasure, the first Islamic manuscript in the Philippines to be declared as such.

Bangsa Sug and Bangsa Moro
In 2018, a unification gathering of all the sultans of the Sulu archipelago and representatives from all ethnic communities in the Sulu archipelago commenced in Zamboanga City, declaring themselves as the Bangsa Sug peoples and separating them from the Bangsa Moro peoples of mainland central Mindanao. They cited the complete difference in cultures and customary ways of life as the primary reason for their separation from the Muslims of mainland central Mindanao. They also called the government to establish a separate Philippine state, called Bangsa Sug, from mainland Bangsa Moro or to incorporate the Sulu archipelago to whatever state is formed in the Zamboanga peninsula, if ever federalism in the Philippines is approved in the coming years.

Balik Islam
There is also a growing community of Filipino converts to Islam known popularly as Balik Islam (return or returnees to Islam), often led by former Christian missionary converts.
 At the end of 2014, the NCMF estimated that there were 200,000–2,000,000 Filipinos who had converted to Islam since the 1970s.

Bangsamoro Region

Most Muslims in the Philippines live on the island of Mindanao, the Sulu Archipelago and Palawan. The Bangsamoro Autonomous Region in Muslim Mindanao (BARMM) is the region of the Philippines that is composed of all the Philippines' predominantly Muslim provinces, namely: Basilan (except Isabela City), Lanao del Sur, Maguindanao, Sulu and Tawi-Tawi. It also comprised the cities of Marawi, Lamitan, and Cotabato City and the 63 Barangays in North Cotabato who opted to join the autonomous region. It is the only region that has its own government. The regional capital is at Cotabato City, which is outside the jurisdiction of the former and defunct Autonomous Region in Muslim Mindanao (ARMM) but is now part of the Bangsamoro region after the majority of the residents voted in favor for their inclusion in the autonomous region in the ratification of the Bangsamoro Organic Law on January 21, 2019.

Other provinces and regions with large Muslim populations as well have a significant history with Moro/Muslims include North Cotabato, Bicol Region, Eastern Visayas, South Cotabato, Sultan Kudarat and the Zamboanga Peninsula. However, these are not part of the Bangsamoro region.

Demographics

The predominantly Muslim ethnolinguistic groups of the Philippines are the Iranun, Jama Mapun, Kalagan, Kalibugan, Maguindanao, Maranaw, Molbog, Sama (including the Badjao, Balanguingui, and various Tawi-Tawi Sama groups), Sangil, Tausūg, and Yakan.

Traditional art from the Philippines by Muslim groups

See also
 List of mosques in the Philippines
 Religion in the Philippines

References

External links
 Bangsamoro
 Filipino Muslim 
 Fil-Mus Foundation
 Islam and Muslims in the Philippines
 National Commission on Muslim Filipinos  is a government agency whose objective is to promote the rights of Muslim Filipinos and to make them active participants in Philippine nation-building.